The Department of Transport is a department of the Government of Ireland that is responsible for transport policy and overseeing transport services and infrastructure. The department is led by the Minister for Transport.

Departmental team

The official headquarters and ministerial offices of the department are in Leeson Lane, Dublin. It also has offices in Killarney and Loughrea. The departmental team consists of the following:

Minister for Transport: Eamon Ryan, TD
Minister of State for International and Road Transport and Logistics: Jack Chambers, TD
Secretary General of the Department: Ken Spratt

Affiliated bodies

State Agencies
Among the State Agencies that report to, are appointed by the Minister, or are otherwise affiliated to the department are:
National Transport Authority 
Road Safety Authority
Transport Infrastructure Ireland
Irish Aviation Authority
Irish Coast Guard
Commission for Aviation Regulation
Air Accident Investigation Unit

State-sponsored bodies
Among the state-sponsored bodies sponsored by the Minister are:
 Córas Iompair Éireann and its subsidiaries.
 Dublin Airport Authority and the shadow Cork authorities.
 Dublin Port Company

History

The Department of Transport and Power was created by the Ministers and Secretaries (Amendment) Act 1959 with Erskine H. Childers as its first minister. Thekla Beere was appointed as the Secretary of the Department in that year, making it the first government department to be led by a woman. On 2 January 1984, the Department of Transport was abolished under the Ministers and Secretaries (Amendment) Act 1983.

The Department of the Public Service was created in 1973. Throughout most of the period of this ministerial title, it was held by a minister who also had another ministerial role. In 1987, at the formation of the 20th government, the substantive functions of the Department of the Public Service were transferred to the Department of Finance, and the Department of the Public Service was renamed as the Department of Tourism and Transport; therefore, the current Department of Transport is formally a successor to the Department of the Public Service established in 1973.

Alteration of name and transfer of functions

See also

 Driving licence in the Republic of Ireland

References

External links

Structure of the Department
Spending by the Department

 
Transport
Ireland, Transport
Transport in the Republic of Ireland
Ireland, Transport
1959 establishments in Ireland
Transport organisations based in Ireland